Francis Fletcher (March 1, 1814 – October 7, 1871) was a prominent pioneer of the U.S. state of Oregon and a member of the Peoria Party.

Biography
Born in Allerston, Yorkshire, England, he immigrated with his parents, William and Mary Fletcher and four brothers, to Nassagaweya Township, Ontario, Canada in 1825. Moving as a young man to Peoria, Illinois he joined the Oregon Dragoons and traveled overland on what was to become the Oregon Trail, arriving in the Willamette Valley of Oregon in 1840.  There he took a Donation Land Claim along the Yamhill River adjacent to his lifelong friend and fellow dragoon Amos Cook. On May 2, 1843, Cook and Fletcher were among the settlers present at Champoeg, Oregon who voted to create the Provisional Government of Oregon, the first American government west of the Rocky Mountains.

Personal
In 1843 he married Miss Elizabeth Smith who had arrived in the Willamette Valley earlier that year after crossing the Oregon Trail with her parents, Andrew and Polly Smith. The Fletchers raised eight children. Fletcher volunteered for service in the Cayuse War of 1848 and was on the first board of trustees of Willamette University. He died on his farm near Dayton, Oregon and is buried in Brookside Cemetery. His house in Dayton is on the National Register of Historic Places.

References

Corning, Howard M., editor. Dictionary of Oregon History. Portland, Oregon: Binfords & Mort, 1956.
Dobbs, Caroline C. Men of Champoeg. 1932. Reprint Cottage Grove, Oregon: Emerald Valley Craftsmen, 1975.

External links
Oregon or the Grave
Francis Fletcher in Findagrave
Francis Fletcher - Oregon Pioneer

1814 births
1871 deaths
Champoeg Meetings
Cayuse War
Willamette University people
People from Yamhill County, Oregon
Oregon pioneers
People from Dayton, Oregon
People from Peoria, Illinois